Ryan Stassel (born October 23, 1992) is an American snowboarder.

Career
Stassel, other wise known as "razzle dazzle", grew up snowboarding at Hilltop Ski Area, in recent years he began competing internationally.  In January 2014, he was selected as one of the players for Winter Olympics of the U.S. slopestyle snowboard team. Stassel regarded it as "I never thought this would truly happen."

2014 Winter Olympics
Stassel finished at 14th spot in the 2014 Olympic slopestyle snowboard competition.

See also
 Snowboarding at the 2014 Winter Olympics – Men's slopestyle

References

1992 births
American male snowboarders
Living people
Olympic snowboarders of the United States
Snowboarders at the 2014 Winter Olympics
Snowboarders at the 2018 Winter Olympics
Sportspeople from Anchorage, Alaska
20th-century American people
21st-century American people